Rai Taimoor Khan Bhatti is a Pakistani politician who was the Provincial Minister of Punjab for Youth Affairs, Sports, Archaeology and Tourism. He had been a member of the Provincial Assembly of the Punjab from August 2018 till January 2023. He became the youngest member of the provincial cabinet on 27 August 2018 when he was appointed as the Provincial of Punjab for Youth Affairs and Sports Government of Punjab. On 19 July 2019 he was given the additional ministerial portfolio of Tourism.

Political career

He was elected to the Provincial Assembly of the Punjab as an independent candidate from Constituency PP-124 (Jhang-I) in 2018 Pakistani general election.

He joined Pakistan Tehreek-e-Insaf (PTI) following his election.

On 27 August 2018, he was inducted into the provincial Punjab cabinet of Chief Minister Sardar Usman Buzdar and was appointed as Provincial Minister of Punjab for Youth Affairs and Sports.

On 19 July 2019 He was given additional ministerial Portfolio of Provincial Minister of Punjab for Tourism.

Departmental Reforms: After assuming the portfolio of Minister for Youth Affairs, Sports, Archaeology and Tourism Government of Punjab, He started departmental reforms process. 72nd Punjab Games were held after a gap of 8 years in April 2019. Training and coaching camps were organized at Divisional level for athletes of Punjab. Punjab's first sports policy's draft is ready and will be presented to provincial cabinet, Department has prepared a special scheme named Prioritized Sports Punjab in which five individual sports i.e. Athletics, Wrestling, Weightlifting, Boxing and Badminton are selected. 75 Athletes will be selected from all over the province for a period of three years. Department of Sports will provide training, boarding and education facilities to them.

Sports Board Punjab hosted Kabbadi Worldcup 2020 which is a major sports highlight for Pakistan. 9 International teams participated in the event. Pakistan defeated India in the finals held at Punjab International Football Stadium Lahore.

References

Living people
Punjab MPAs 2018–2023
Pakistan Tehreek-e-Insaf MPAs (Punjab)
Provincial ministers of Punjab
Year of birth missing (living people)